Wentworth is a township municipality in the Laurentides region of Quebec, Canada, part of the Argenteuil Regional County Municipality, north-west of Lachute.

Its population centres are Louisa and Dunany.

Geography

However, much of the land was cleared by early Irish settlers for farming and there remains small pockets of pastures along the Dalesville River, especially in the Glen and around the town center. It is dotted with many lakes, such as Curran, Black, McDougall, Rainbow, and most notably Lake Louisa - the largest lake in the Regional County. These lakes attract many cottage vacationers and fishing enthusiasts.

The headwater of the Dalesville River, the largest river in Wentworth, begins at the outlet of Barrows Lake on the western edge of the municipality and meanders for approximately 12 km through the municipality.

History
The Gale and Duberger map of 1795 already shows the Wentworth Township, but it was not officially established until 1809. It is unclear if it is named after a village in York County, England, or that it is a tribute to Sir John Wentworth (1737-1820), Lieutenant Governor of Nova Scotia from 1792 to 1808.

Around 1830, a group of settlers composed of Irish and French Canadians, began clearing the rough land with difficulty. In 1845, the Gore Municipality was established, which included the Gore and Wentworth Townships, but it was abolished two years later. In 1855, the Wentworth Township Municipality was formed.

In 1914, a small portion of the Wentworth and Montcalm Townships separated and formed the Municipality of Lac-des-Seize-Îles, and in 1958, Wentworth lost a large chunk of its territory when the Municipality of Wentworth-Nord separated.

Demographics 

Mother tongue:
 English as first language: 40.9%
 French as first language: 52.6%
 English and French as first language: 2.2%
 Other as first language: 2.9%

Local government

Wentworth forms part of the federal electoral district of Argenteuil—La Petite-Nation and has been represented by Stéphane Lauzon of the Liberal Party since 2015. Provincially, Wentworth is part of the Argenteuil electoral district and is represented by Agnès Grondin of the Coalition Avenir Québec since 2018.

List of former mayors:

 Marcel Raymond (... –2005)
 Normand Champoux (2005–2009)
 Edmund Kasprzyk (2009–2013)
 Marcel Harvey (2013–2016)
 Jason Morrison (2016–present)

Education

The Commission scolaire de la Rivière-du-Nord operates French-language public schools.
 École polyvalente Lavigne in Lachute

The Sir Wilfrid Laurier School Board operates English-language public schools:
 Laurentian Elementary School in Lachute
 Laurentian Regional High School in Lachute

See also
List of township municipalities in Quebec

References

External links

Township municipalities in Quebec
Incorporated places in Laurentides